Murray Edward Fishlock (born 23 September 1973) is an English former footballer who played in the Football League as a left back for Hereford United.

Career
Fishlock was born in Marlborough, Wiltshire. He began his football career as a junior with Swindon Town, but never appeared for the first team. He left for Gloucester City in 1992, where he made 74 appearances and scored 6 goals in all competitions. He joined Trowbridge Town in order to be nearer home and college, but manager John Layton soon signed him for Third Division club Hereford United. He made his debut in the Football League on 1 October 1994 in a 2–1 home win against Scunthorpe United. He had three seasons in the Football League and one in the Conference with Hereford before moving to Yeovil Town.

He played 57 games in all competitions for Yeovil, scoring twice, and was capped for the England semi-professional representative team, before suffering a back injury in a game against Dover Athletic in January 2000. The injury would eventually force him to retire from the game, after two years on the sidelines and a few appearances with lower-league clubs including Woking, Melksham Town, Chippenham Town, and Pewsey Vale.

From September 2005 to March 2014, Fishlock worked for the Football Foundation.

References

External links
 

1973 births
Living people
People from Marlborough, Wiltshire
Footballers from Wiltshire
English footballers
England semi-pro international footballers
Association football fullbacks
Swindon Town F.C. players
Gloucester City A.F.C. players
Trowbridge Town F.C. players
Hereford United F.C. players
Yeovil Town F.C. players
Woking F.C. players
Melksham Town F.C. players
Chippenham Town F.C. players
Pewsey Vale F.C. players
English Football League players
National League (English football) players